Bhojraj Ji Ka is Subsub Clan or branch of Shekhawat Clan of Kachawa Dynasty. The descendants of King Bhojraj of Udaipurwati are known as "Bhojraj Ji Ka" Shekhawats. Bhojraj Ji Ka Shekhawats ruled over two territories one was Pentalisa and another was Panchpana.

References

Shekhawati